Eastmain is a Cree community located on east coast of James Bay at the mouth of the Eastmain River, Quebec, Canada. It is a small coastal Cree village with a population of 924 people in the 2021 Canadian Census up from 866 people at the 2016 Canadian Census. Its alternate Cree name is ᐙᐸᓅᑖᐤ/Wâpanûtâw, meaning Lands east of James Bay.

Eastmain is accessible by air (Eastmain River Airport) and by car over a gravel road linking it to the James Bay Road.

The Eastmain community was greatly affected by the James Bay Project, which in 1980 diverted 90% of the Eastmain River to the La Grande River.

History
Like the other coastal villages on Hudson and James Bay, Eastmain was settled around a Hudson's Bay Company trading post, which was originally called East Main House. Some Cree settled there for ease in trading.

Demographics
As of May 2022, the nation counted 943 members, of which 830 persons lived in the Community. there were 223 private dwellings that are occupied by usual residents, out of a total of 280. The mother tongue of the residents is:
 English as first language: 11.0%
 French as first language: 1.2%
 Cree as first language: 86.1%
 Other indigenous languages: 1.6%

Population trend:
 Population in 2001: 614
 Population in 2006: 650 
 Population in 2011: 767 
 Population in 2016: 866 (2011 to 2016 population change: 12.9%)
 Population in 2021: 924 (2016 to 2021 population change: 6.7%)

Climate
Eastmain has a subarctic climate (Dfc), typical of communities along the eastern shore of the James Bay. Summers are mild and rainy, with mild days and cool nights. Winters are cold with extremely heavy annual snowfall, averaging .

Economy
With a population nearing 1000, the main economic activities of the community are its services sectors. This would include a restaurant within a hotel, private businesses, and a construction company with a gas station and garage. Eastmain is also the headquarters for the Cree Regional Trappers Association, whose role is to support all local Cree Trappers by maintaining the practices of their traditional activities. Other services include its emergency service departments, local radio station, post office, local schools, government service sectors, sports and recreation complex, local development corporation, and local medical services.

Education
The Cree School Board operates the Wabannutao Eeyou School.

See also
Grand Council of the Crees

References

External links
Cree Nation of Eastmain 
Cree Communities of Quebec

Cree villages in Quebec
Hudson's Bay Company trading posts
Eeyou Istchee (territory)